The Broadcast (formerly The Fisheries Broadcast) is a long-running radio program based in St. John's, Newfoundland and Labrador and has been airing on CBC Radio since 1951. It focuses on stories about Newfoundlanders whose jobs and livelihoods depend on the ocean. For years, it was originally known as The Fisherman's Broadcast (or Fishermen's), but has been affectionately known as The Broadcast. The current host is Paula Gale. The show was officially renamed The Broadcast on August 31, 2015.

The program currently airs on all CBC Radio One stations in Newfoundland and Labrador every weekday at 6:00 p.m. (5:30 AT).

The program celebrated its 70th anniversary on March 5, 2021, making it one of the longest-running radio programs in North American radio history.

References

External links
 The Broadcast

CBC Radio One programs
Canadian talk radio programs
1951 radio programme debuts